Dundas House is a Neoclassical building in Edinburgh, Scotland. It is located at 36 St Andrew Square, in the city's first New Town. The building was completed in 1774 as a private town house for Sir Lawrence Dundas by the architect Sir William Chambers. Much altered internally and extended over the years, today it is the registered office of the Royal Bank of Scotland and its parent, NatWest Group and is protected as a category A listed building.

Background
The site was previously occupied by a rural tavern known as "Peace and Plenty". This stood on the road from Edinburgh to Stockbridge, later called Gabriels Road, and still extant at its extremities.

When the town council made plans for a New Town drawn up by James Craig in 1767, the site of Dundas House was shown as a proposed church, St. Andrew's (hence the name of the square), acting as a counterpart to St. George's Church on what became Charlotte Square (originally to be called George Square but another scheme to the south of the Old Town had taken that name first). The two were separated by the New Town itself laid out on a formal grid centred on George Street along which the two churches were to face each other.

Sir Lawrence Dundas saw the layout and decided the church site would make a good location for a prestigious town mansion, and in 1768 he acquired the land. Initially, he invited designs from the architects John Carr and James Byres, but their proposals were not adopted. Dundas then turned to Sir William Chambers who drew up plans for the mansion in early 1771. The designs were agreed, and soon afterwards construction began on the house. The building was completed by January 1774.

In 1780 Hugo Arnot described the building as "incomparably the handsomest townhouse we ever saw".

The proposed St Andrew's Church was subsequently built at a less prominent site at 13 George Street.

Commercial use
Lord Dundas died in 1781 and his son Sir Thomas Dundas, 2nd Baronet inherited the house. Having no great desire to live here (then the site was in the midst of a huge building site as the New Town construction began) he sold the house to the government in 1794 who converted it to the Excise House, which opened in 1795. At this stage it gained the royal coat of arms of the British Customs and Excise in its pediment.

Dundas House was acquired by the Royal Bank of Scotland in 1825 for £35,300. The interior was altered in 1825 and 1828 by Archibald Elliot the Younger, and in 1836 by William Burn. Much of these alterations were removed by John Dick Peddie in 1857 when a banking hall with a distinctive pierced dome was added to the rear of the existing house.

In 1834, a statue of John Hope, 4th Earl of Hopetoun, who had served as Governor of the Bank 1820–23, was placed in the garden in front of Dundas House. The statue was originally commissioned in 1824 by a group of high ranking persons in Edinburgh, led by James Gibson Craig, from the sculptor Thomas Campbell. Campbell created it in Rome and it was shipped to Britain in 1828. The current position was agreed by the architect in January 1830, and an appropriate plinth was designed to respect the frontage of Dundas House. Although several sources state that the statue was designed for Charlotte Square, there is no evidence of any plans for locating on that site, and Hope's link to the Royal Bank make Dundas House a more obvious first choice.

In 1972 the 19th-century banking screens and counters were removed and replaced by white marble counters.

Architecture

Dundas House is a free-standing house designed in the Palladian style. It was modelled on Roger Morris's 1729 Palladian villa Marble Hill House in Twickenham, London but is much grander.

The house is built of cream sandstone ashlar, weathered to light grey, from Ravelston Quarry some three miles to the west. It is fronted with a set of Corinthian pilasters supporting a large central pediment. The house is faced with ashlar with a rusticated ground floor.

The large, opulent banking hall, added by Peddie in 1857, is covered by a large circular blue dome which is pierced by 5 tiers of star-shaped gold-rimmed coffered skylights radiating out from the central oculus which diminish in size towards the centre, representing the firmament. An illustration of this star pattern featured on Royal Bank of Scotland's "Islay" series of banknotes which were in circulation 1987–2016.

Future use
In plans unveiled by the International Music and Performing Arts Charitable Trust Scotland (IMPACT Scotland) in 2017, a new concert hall called the Impact Centre will be built behind Dundas House, replacing a block of banking offices that was built in the 1960s. Dundas House will be retained as a bank branch, accessible to the public.

See also
 Banknotes of Scotland (featured on design)

References

External links
Edinburgh Bank — BBC Nationwide  (BBC Archive, 1974)

Category A listed buildings in Edinburgh
Royal Bank of Scotland
Listed houses in Scotland
New Town, Edinburgh
William Chambers buildings
Houses completed in 1774
1774 establishments in Scotland
Palladian architecture
Domes
Bank buildings in the United Kingdom
House